Valréas is a commune in the Vaucluse department in the Provence-Alpes-Côte d'Azur region in southeastern France.

History
The area around the town of Valréas is known as L'Enclave des Papes. It is an enclave of Vaucluse, surrounded by the department of the Drôme. The foundation of the Enclave began in 1317 when Pope John XXII bought Valreas for the papacy of Avignon. The story goes that following a visit to Valreas, feeling unwell he was offered some wine from the area. Liking it he decided to purchase the town to ensure his wine supply. Over the next 150 years or so his successors added to the Enclave by the addition of the small towns of Visan, Richerenches and Grillon. The boundaries were defined by tall stone markers carrying the coat of Arms of the Popes. The present day boundaries are still delimited by some of these stones, one of which is outside the entrance to the Valreas Tourist office. When the departments of France were created after the Revolution the people of the Enclave requested to remain as part of the department of Vaucluse (see Comtat Venaissin). Hence the "Enclave des Papes".

Population

Twin towns
Valréas is twinned with:
 Sachsenheim, Germany
 Saint Paul, Quebec, Canada
 Montignoso, Italy

See also
Communes of the Vaucluse department
List of works by Louis Botinelly

References

Communes of Vaucluse
Enclaves and exclaves